"Come Home, Father" (also known as "Poor Benny") is a temperance song written by Henry Clay Work in 1864. According to George Birdseye, a contemporary biographer of the time, the song was the "pioneer and pattern for all the many temperance pieces now in the market, not a few of which are very palpable imitations." Although the sheet music was first published in 1864, the song is believed to have been first performed in 1858 as part of the Broadway play, Ten Nights in a Barroom, an adaptation of the 1854 temperance novel. The song was eventually adopted as the anthem of the Woman's Christian Temperance Union.

Storyline 

The song is about a young child (popularly named Mary) who is yearning for her drunken father to return home. Her younger brother, Benny, is sick and becomes progressively sicker as the night hours pass. The fire in the house is extinguished, and the mother is tending to young Benny, who eventually dies by 3 o'clock at night.

Lyrics 
Father, dear father, come home with me now,

The clock in the steeple strikes one;

You said you were coming right home from the shop

As soon as your day's work was done;

Our fire has gone out, our house is all dark,

And mother's been watching since tea,

With poor brother Benny so sick in her arms

And no one to help her but me,

Come home! come home! come home!

Please father, dear father, come home.

Chorus: 

Hear the sweet voice of the child,

Which the night-winds repeat as they roam;

Oh who could resist this most plaintive of prayers

"Please father, dear father, come home."

Father, dear father, come home with me now,

The clock in the steeple strikes two;

The night has grown colder, and Benny is worse

But he has been calling for you:

Indeed he is worse, ma says he will die--

Perhaps before morning shall dawn;

And this is the message she sent me to bring

"Come quickly, or he will be gone."

Come home! come home! come home!

Please father, dear father, come home.

Chorus

Father, dear father, come home with me now,

The clock in the steeple strikes three;

The house is so lonely, the hours are so long,

For poor weeping mother and me;

Yes, we are alone, poor Benny is dead,

And gone with the angels of light;

And these were the very last words that he said

"I want to kiss papa good-night."

Come home! come home! come home!

Please father, dear father, come home.

Chorus

In popular culture 
It was sung in the 1940 musical comedy film, Strike Up the Band, during the "Nell of New Rochelle" sequence by Larry Nunn and Judy Garland.

It was featured in the 1941 animated short film, The Nifty Nineties, as part of a vaudeville show portraying the Gay Nineties.

Christine McIntyre sings the song in a saloon as part of the 1945 Western comedy short film, Pistol Packin' Nitwits.

The song was performed as part of a comedy routine in the 1953 film, Cruisin' Down the River.

The song has been recorded by The Peerless Quartet (1925), Bela Lam & His Greene County Singers (1927), Dixie Reelers (1936), Bunny Berigan (1938), The Blue Sky Boys (1939), Jerry Silverman (1990), and others.

References

External links 
Score

1925 recording from the Internet Archive
1864 songs
Songs written by Henry Clay Work